Jānis Peive ( – 12 October 1976) was a Latvian communist politician who served as Chairman of the Council of Ministers of the Latvian SSR from 1959 to 1962. He was Chairman of the Soviet of Nationalities from 1958 to 1966.

References

1906 births
1976 deaths
People from Toropetsky District
People from Toropetsky Uyezd
Communist Party of Latvia politicians
Central Committee of the Communist Party of the Soviet Union members
Chairmen of the Soviet of Nationalities
Fourth convocation members of the Soviet of Nationalities
Fifth convocation members of the Soviet of Nationalities
Sixth convocation members of the Soviet of Nationalities
Seventh convocation members of the Soviet of Nationalities
Heads of government of the Latvian Soviet Socialist Republic
Full Members of the USSR Academy of Sciences
Academicians of the Latvian SSR Academy of Sciences
Lenin Prize winners
Heroes of Socialist Labour
Recipients of the Order of Lenin
Burials at Novodevichy Cemetery